This list of castles in Brittany is a list of medieval castles or château forts in the region in western France.

Links in italics are links to articles in the French Wikipedia.

Côtes-d'Armor

Castles of which little or nothing remains include 
Château de Montafilan.

Finistère

Castles of which little or nothing remains include 
Château de Joyeuse Garde and Château de Rustéphan.

Ille-et-Vilaine

Morbihan

See also
 List of castles in France
 List of châteaux in France

References

 Brittany